Jean "Jenny" Thompson (later Barker; October 15, 1910 (or August 10) – September 16, 1976) was a Canadian middle-distance runner. She finished in fourth place in the 800 m at the 1928 Summer Olympics, when women competitions were first introduced to the Olympic Games.

Thompson was the fifth of seven children of David and Margaret Thompson. She was born in Toronto, but her family later moved to Hamilton and then to Penetanguishene. In 1924 her mother died in a car accident. Thompson started training in athletics in 1925, soon after enrolling to Penetang High School, and already in 1928 won the national title in the 800 m, setting a world record and qualifying for the Olympics.

Despite her small size, she also competed in throwing, and in 1929 won national titles in the shot put, discus throw and in the long jump; she also won competitions in the 100 yd, 220 yd, high jump and javelin throw. In 1930 she graduated from the Margaret Eaton School of Physical Education and later worked at a brokerage firm. In 1933 she married Roderick Barker, a Bell Telephone District manager; they later settled in Sainte-Anne-de-Bellevue, Quebec. In 1987, Jean Thompson was posthumously inducted into the Penetanguishene Sports Hall of Fame.

Her great-nephew, Russ Howard, is a retired Olympic curler.

References

1910 births
1976 deaths
Athletes from Toronto
Athletes (track and field) at the 1928 Summer Olympics
Olympic track and field athletes of Canada
Canadian female middle-distance runners